Eupithecia fibigeri is a moth in the family Geometridae. It is found in Nepal.

The wingspan is about 16.5-20.5 mm. The forewings are pale brownish grey and the hindwings are slightly paler brownish grey.

References

Moths described in 2010
fibigeri
Moths of Asia